"The Magician’s Tea-Party" is a fairytale written by British suffragist and author Evelyn Sharp in 1900.

Summary 
The story starts with little King Wistful, the eight-year-old king of the Cheerful Isles, or as he renamed them, the Monotonous Isles. The King slips through the gates to go look for something interesting because he finds that his kingdom is the “dullest and ugliest and the most wearisome place in the world.”

The King, now outside, surveys his kingdom, commenting on how stupid his kingdom is, and feeling sorry for himself, then he hears a voice.  The voice is from a little girl singing.  The little girl is singing for the little King Wistful to come and play.

Sing-song! Don't be long!
Wistful, Wistful, come and play!
Sing-song! It's very wrong
To stay and stay and stay away!
The world is much too nice a place
To make you pull so long a face;
It's full of people being kind,
And full of flowers for you to find;
There's heaps of folks for you to tease
And all the naughtiness you please;
To sulk is surely waste of time
When all those trees are yours to climb!
Ting-a-ring! Make haste, King!
I've something really nice to say;
Ting-a-ring! A proper King
Would not make me sing all day!

When the girl comes into sight the King notices that she has the “brightest brown eyes” that he had ever seen. The little girl introduces herself as Eyebright and when asked where she learned her song, she replies that the magician taught her and that she needed to sing it every day until the King came.

The two talk for a time and the King tells Eyebright about how stupid his kingdom is while Eyebright tries to change his mind about it.  Eyebright does not manage to change the little King's mind but does get him to follow her to go to see the Magician. The two children travel to the middle island, through woods and into a boat to get to the Magician’s cave.

The two enter the cave and Eyebright tells the Magician that she brought the King and that he must disenchant the King so that he can see what a wonderful kingdom he has. After shaking hands with the King the Magician invites them to sit with him for tea. The Magician performs some magic for a table and chairs to appear.  The King and Eyebright set the table and the three proceed to have a delightful tea-party.

After tea the children tell the Magician just why they came in the first place.  The Magician tells them that the reason that the King cannot see his kingdom for the wonderful place that it is, was because the wymps threw dust in his eyes as a baby.  The Magician explains why the wymps would do such a thing and tells them where they have to go to try to get the wymps to reverse what they did, Wympland, and how they were to get there.  The Magician then sends the children to Wympland on a flash of lightning.

The King and Eyebright, now in Wympland, look around and find a wymp to talk to.  They to talk with the wymp and the King tells him that the wymps threw dust in his eyes as a child.  The wymp reveals to them that there is only one thing to do; they must exchange eyes, only thing to be done.  The Wymp tells them how to exchange eyes and without hesitation Eyebright switches their eyes.  The King is unhappy about this as he did not want Eyebright to have to see things through his eyes but at this point he has little choice.

The King and Eyebright suddenly appear back home, looking over the kingdom.  The King can now see just how wonderful and beautiful his kingdom is.  Eyebright thought she could only see five round islands in a row, but the King cannot possibly be mistaken so she agrees that it is a beautiful kingdom.  Eyebright then runs off and the King returns home to bed.

The final lines tell of how there is now a Queen as well as a King of the Monotonous Isles.  This Queen always agrees with the King when he tells of how beautiful the kingdom is.  While this may be remarkable it needs to be remembered that “the Queen sees everything with the King's eyes.”

References 

Children's short stories
1900 short stories
British fairy tales
Fiction about magic